Maria Elena Camerin and Vera Dushevina were the defending champions, having won the event in 2012, but Dushevina chose not to participate in 2013. Camerin partnered up with Tadeja Majerič, but they lost in the first round to Elena Bogdan and Valeria Savinykh.

Vitalia Diatchenko and Olga Savchuk won the tournament, defeating Lyudmyla and Nadiya Kichenok in the final, 7–5, 6–1.

Seeds

Draw

References 
 Draw

Al Habtoor Tennis Challenge - Doubles
Al Habtoor Tennis Challenge
2013 in Emirati tennis